The Two of Them may refer to:

 The Two of Them (film), 1977 Hungarian film
 The Two of Them (novel), by Joanna Russ